Heliaea is:
 Heliaea (fly), a genus of flies in the family Tachinidae
 A different spelling for Heliaia, a court in Athenian democracy